S8 is a line on the Berlin S-Bahn. It operates from Wildau to Birkenwerder over:
the Görlitz line, opened in 1866 and electrified in 1929, 
the Ring line, completed in 1877 and electrified in 1926,
the Outer ring, completed on 22 November 1952 and electrified for the S-Bahn in 1962,
and a short section of the Prussian Northern line, opened on 10 July 1877 and electrified on 8 August 1925.

In popular culture
An S8 train to Zeuthen appears in the opening frames of Pet Shop Boys' music video for the single Leaving from the album Elysium (2012).

Gallery

References

External links
 

Berlin S-Bahn lines

fi:S8 (Berliinin S-Bahn)